Gerry Tierney (Gearóid Ó Tighearnaigh; IPA:ˈɟaɾˠoːdʲ oː ˈtʲɪjəɾˠn̪ˠiː) (1923–1979) was a popular bi-lingual Irish radio broadcaster for RTÉ. He hosted the radio quiz show Twenty Questions.

Biography
Tierney was born in Churchtown near Mallow, County Cork, on 7 February 1923. His musical radio programme which underwent a few name changes—Musical Cavalcade, then Ceol do Pháistí, and finally Planxty Gearóid—spanned nearly 20 years from the late 1950s to the mid-1970s.  He broadcast to the Irish nation every Sunday with his varying choice of music ranging from "high-" to "middle-brow" across all genres.  The low timbre of his voice and his infectious laughter were unmistakable and the RTÉ radio Quiz show, Twenty Questions, which he hosted, also proved to be another firm family favourite.

Tierney died from a heart attack in January 1979, aged 55.

References

Other sources
Radio Telefís Éireann 'RTÉ' - Ireland's National Broadcasting Corporation
https://stillslibrary.rte.ie
http://gerardtierney.makinghaytheatre.ie/articles.html
RTE Guide, November 1, 1968
RTE Guide, May 2, 1969
RTE Guide, October 2, 1970
RTE Guide, April 30, 1971
RTE Guide, March 10, 1972
RTE Guide, April 27, 1973
Irish plays co-written with Martin Dempsey
Abbey Theatre archives
www.nli.ie/pdfs/mss%20lists/074_deBurca.pdf  Conradh na Gaeilge (page 112)
Churchtown Village Renewal Trust

External links
Extracts of his programmes (1971-1972), Planxty Gearóid, Twenty Questions, and St. Patrick's Day Special 1971

1923 births
1979 deaths